Habrophlebia is a genus of pronggilled mayflies in the family Leptophlebiidae. There are about nine described species in Habrophlebia.

Species
These nine species belong to the genus Habrophlebia:
 Habrophlebia antoninoi Alba-Tercedor, 2000 c g
 Habrophlebia consiglioi Biancheri, 1959 c g
 Habrophlebia eldae Jacob & Sartori, 1984 c g
 Habrophlebia fusca (Curtis, 1834) i c g
 Habrophlebia gilliesi Peter, 1963 g
 Habrophlebia lauta McLachlan, 1884 c g
 Habrophlebia tenella Kang & Yang, 1994 g
 Habrophlebia vaillantorum Thomas, 1986 c g
 Habrophlebia vibrans Needham, 1907 i c g b
Data sources: i = ITIS, c = Catalogue of Life, g = GBIF, b = Bugguide.net

References

Further reading

 
 
 
 
 
 

Mayfly genera
Insects of Europe
Mayflies